Breathing Fire is a 1991 martial arts film

"Breathing Fire", song by Fu Manchu from King of the Road (album) 2000
"Breathing Fire", song by Tarot from To Live Again (album) and Follow Me into Madness
"Breathing Fire", song by Anne-Marie from Speak Your Mind